Histan (also Romanized as Hīstān; also known as Hīsūn and ‘Īsūn) is a village in Jey Rural District, in the Central District of Isfahan County, Isfahan Province, Iran. At the 2006 census, its population was 440, in 106 families.

References 

Populated places in Isfahan County